Bülstringen is a municipality in the Börde district in Saxony-Anhalt, Germany. On 1 January 2010 it absorbed the former municipality Wieglitz.

References

Municipalities in Saxony-Anhalt
Börde (district)